Łężyce  is a village in the administrative district of Gmina Wejherowo, within Wejherowo County, Pomeranian Voivodeship, in northern Poland. It is located within the ethnocultural region of Kashubia in the historic region of Pomerania.

The village has a population of 407.

Łężyce was a royal village of the Polish Crown, administratively located in the Puck County in the Pomeranian Voivodeship.

Notable people
  (1888–1939), Polish Catholic priest, activist, member of the Polish resistance movement in partitioned Poland, and founder of the Polska Żyje Polish resistance organisation during World War II, murdered by the Germans in Cewice
  (1897–1939), Polish activist and soldier, murdered by the Germans in the Massacres in Piaśnica during World War II

References

Villages in Wejherowo County